The works of Tristan Tzara include poems, plays and essays. A number of his works contain artwork by well-known artists of the time, including Pablo Picasso and Henri Matisse.

 La Première Aventure céleste de monsieur Antipyrine (The First Celestial Adventure of Mr. Antipyrine; 1916) with colour wood engravings by Marcel Janco.
 Monsieur Aa l'antiphilosophe (Mr. Aa the Antiphilosophy; 1916-1924).
 Lampisteries (1917-1922).
 Vingt-cinq poèmes (Twenty-five poems; 1918), with engravings by Hans Arp.
 Cinéma Calendrier du cœur abstrait, Maisons (1920), with wood engravings by Hans Arp.
 Le cœur à barbe (The Bearded Heart; 1922).
 De nos oiseaux : poèmes (Of Our Birds: Poems; 1923), with illustrations by Hans Arp.
 Sept Manifestes Dada (Seven Dada Manifestos;  1924), with drawings by Francis Picabia.
 Minutes pour géants (1916-1924).
 Faites vos jeux (1923).
 Mouchoir de nuages (Handkerchief of Clouds;1924), with etchings by Juan Gris.
 Indicateur des chemins de cœur (1928), with etchings by Louis Marcoussis.
 L’arbre des voyageurs (The Tree of Voyagers; 1930).
 Piège en herbe (1930).
 Essai sur la situation de la poésie (Essay on the Situation of Poetry; 1931).
 L’Homme approximatif (Approximate Man; 1931), with etching by Paul Klee.
 La Fonte des ans (1931).
 La Puisatier des regards (1932).
 Où boivent les loups (1932).
 Le Désespéranto (1932-1933).
 L’Antitête (1933).
 L’Abrégé de la nuit (1934).
 Personnage d'insomnie (1934).
 Grains et Issues (1935) with etching by Salvador Dalí.
 Les mutations radieuses (1935-1936).
 La Main passe (1935).
 Ramures (1936), with drawing by Alberto Giacometti.
 Sur le champ (1937).
 La Deuxième Aventure céleste de monsieur Antipyrine (1938).
 Midis gagnés (1939), with drawings by Henri Matisse.
 Ça va (1944).
 Une Route Seul Soleil (1944).
 Le Cœur à gaz (The Gas Heart; 1946), with illustrations by Max Ernst.
 Entre-temps (1946).
 La Signe de vie (1946).
 Terre sur terre (1946), with lithograph by André Masson.
 Vingt-cinq et un poème (1946), with drawings by Hans Arp.
 La Dialectique de la poésie (1947).
 La Fuite : poème dramatique en quatre actes et un épilogue (1947).
 Le Surréalisme et l’Après-Guerre (1947).
 Morceaux choisis (1947).
 Midis gagnés republished expanded edition (1948).
 Picasso et les chemins de la connaissance (1948).
 Phases (1949), Seghers, with portrait by Alberto Giacometti.
 Sans coup férir (1949), with etching by Suzanne Roger.
 Parler seul (1948), with lithographs by Joan Miró.
 De mémoire d'homme (1950), with lithographs by Pablo Picasso.
 Le poids du monde (1951).
 La Première Main (1951).
 La Face Intérieure (1953).
 Picasso et la poésie (1953).
 L'Egypte; Face à Face (1954), with photo by Etienne Svedala.
 À Haute Flamme (1955) with burin engravings by Pablo Picasso.
 La bonne heure (1955), with an engraving by Georges Braque.
 Le Temps naissant (1955), with illustration by Nejad Devrim.
 Miennes (1955) with etchings by Jacques Villon.
 Parler seul (1955), reedtion with engraving by Hans Arp.
 Le Fruit permis : poèmes (1956), with illustrations by Sonia Delaunay.
 Frère Bois (1956), with an engraving by Jean Hugo.
 La Rose et le Chien (1958), with drawings by Pablo Picasso.
 Vigies (1960), with etchings by Camille Bryen.
 Juste présent (1961), with etchings by Sonia Delaunay.
 Lampisteries, précédé de Sept manifestes Dada (1963), with portraits drawings by Francis Picabia.
 Premiers Poèmes (translated by Claude Sernet) (1965).
 40 chansons et déchansons (1972), with colour lithographs by Jacques Hérold.
 Œuvres complètes Flammarion (1975-1982).
 Cosmic realities vanilla tobacco dawnings (1975).
 Découverte des arts dits primitifs, suivi de Poèmes nègres (2006).

See also
Tristan Tzara

Bibliographies by writer
 
Bibliographies of Romanian writers
Poetry bibliographies
Dramatist and playwright bibliographies